Setouchi may refer to:

Places 
 Setouchi, Kagoshima, a town on Amami Islands, Japan
 Setouchi, Okayama, a city on Honshū, Japan
 Setouchi region, a region of Japan encompassing the Seto Inland Sea and adjacent coastal areas of Honshū, Shikoku, and Kyushu

People 
 Jakucho Setouchi (1922–2021), Japanese Buddhist nun

Other 
 Setouchi Volcanic Belt, a Miocene volcanic belt in southwestern Japan
 Setouchi Junior College, a private junior college in Mitoyo, Kagawa, Japan
 TV Setouchi, a TV station in Japan